2732 Witt, provisional designation , is a bright asteroid and namesake of the Witt family located in the central regions of the asteroid belt, approximately  in diameter. It was discovered on 19 March 1926, by German astronomer Max Wolf at the Heidelberg-Königstuhl State Observatory in Heidelberg, Germany. The unusual A-type asteroid was named after astronomer Carl Gustav Witt.

Orbit and classification 

Witt the parent body and namesake of the Witt family, a large family of stony asteroids with more than 1,600 known members.

It orbits the Sun in the central main-belt at a distance of 2.7–2.8 AU once every 4 years and 7 months (1,675 days; semi-major axis of 2.76 AU). Its orbit has an eccentricity of 0.02 and an inclination of 6° with respect to the ecliptic. The body's observation arc begins at Heidelberg in April 1926, two week after its official discovery observation.

Physical characteristics 

In the SMASS classification, Witt is an uncommon A-type asteroid, while the overall spectral type for members of the Witt family is that of an S-type.

Diameter and albedo 

According to the survey carried out by the NEOWISE mission of NASA's Wide-field Infrared Survey Explorer, Witt measures 11.001 kilometers in diameter and its surface has a high albedo of 0.305.

Rotation period 

As of 2018, no rotational lightcurve of Witt has been obtained from photometric observations. The body's rotation period, pole and shape remain unknown.

Naming 

This minor planet was named by Brian G. Marsden after Carl Gustav Witt (1866–1946), a German astronomer at the Berlin Observatory and a discoverer of minor planets himself, best known for the discovery of the near-Earth asteroid 433 Eros. The official naming citation was published by the Minor Planet Center on 22 September 1983.

References

External links 
 2732 Witt CCD Spectrum, Schelte Bus and Richard Binzel (SMASS), 2004
 2732 Witt, Dwarf Planets and Asteroids: Minor Bodies of the Solar System (p. 42)
 Asteroid Lightcurve Database (LCDB), query form (info )
 Dictionary of Minor Planet Names, Google books
 Discovery Circumstances: Numbered Minor Planets (1)-(5000) – Minor Planet Center
 
 

002732
Discoveries by Max Wolf
Named minor planets
002732
19260319